Emphasis or emphatic may refer to:

Communication
 Emphasis (telecommunications), intentional alteration of the amplitude-vs.-frequency characteristics of the signal meant to reduce adverse effects of noise
 Cultural emphasis, alleged tendency of a language's vocabulary to detail elements of the speakers' culture

Writing
 Emphasis (typography),  visual enhancement a part of a text to make it noticeable
 Emphasis point, a typographic marking used in some east Asian languages to indicate emphasis

Linguistics
 Emphatic consonant, member of a phonological category of consonants in Semitic languages
 Prosodic stress, speaking an important word more loudly or slowly so that it stands out
 Do-support, a way to using additional words to call attention to important words
 Intensifier, a way to using additional words to call attention to important words

Music
 Emphasis! (On Parenthesis), 2008 album by the Stanton Moore Trio
 "Emphasis/Who Wants to Live Forever", 2002 single by After Forever
 Emphatic (band), American rock band

Other uses
 Emphatic Diaglott, 1864 Bible translation by Benjamin Wilson
 ST Emphatic

See also
 Prominence (disambiguation)
 Stress (disambiguation)
 Markedness, quality of a non-basic or less natural linguistic form